Babu Ram Ishara (born Roshan Lal Sharma 7 September 1934 – 25 July 2012) was an Indian film director and screenwriter best known for his films of the 1970s. He filmed 35 Bollywood films between 1964 and 1996. He was much popular for his film Chetana, Log Kya Kahengey, Milap, Man Jaiye, Ghar Ki Laaj, Woh Phir Ayegi,  Sautela Bhai.doosra roop 1982

Life and career 

Ishara was born in Bharwain (Chintpurni), in the Una district, Himachal Pradesh in India. After leaving home to try his luck in Bombay, he became a film director.

His first mainstream film, Insaaf Ka Mandir, starred the actors Tarun Bose and Aruna Irani. Subsequently, he brought cricketer Salim Durrani into cinema with Charitra in which he also introduced Parveen Babi and composer Bappi Lahiri to film audiences. He worked with a number of other newcomers including Danny Dengzongpa, Rakesh Pandey, Vijay Arora, Jaya Bhaduri, Amitabh Bachchan, Reena Roy, Shatrughan Sinha, Raj Kiran and Raza Murad. His film Woh Phir Ayegi with Rajesh Khanna in 1988 was a silver jubilee hit and Sautela Bhai was critically acclaimed.

He got married in 1984 to the Bollywood actress Rehana Sultan.

Ishara died from tuberculosis on 24 July 2012 at 1:30 am in Mumbai's Criticare hospital at age 77.

Filmography

Director

References

External links
 

1934 births
Hindi-language film directors
Indian male screenwriters
2012 deaths
People from Una district
Screenwriters from Himachal Pradesh
Film directors from Himachal Pradesh
20th-century Indian film directors
21st-century deaths from tuberculosis
Tuberculosis deaths in India